Keninjal (Dayak Kaninjal) is a Malayic Dayak language of Borneo. Glottolog classifies Keninjal as a Western Malayic Dayak language alongside Kendayan, but Smith (2017) includes it in the Ibanic branch of Malayic based on phonological evidence.

References

Ibanic languages
Languages of Indonesia
Agglutinative languages